Olhunuvi Hiyy is a 1998 Maldivian film written, produced and directed by Yoosuf Rafeeu. Produced by Bukhari Studio, the film stars Ahmed Azim, Mariyam Nisha and Shazuna in pivotal roles.

Premise
Sheeba (Mariyam Nisha) is a young attractive woman working at a restaurant as a waitress. One night, on her way back to home after duty, she was assaulted by one of her pervert customers, and is saved by the cleaner working at the restaurant, Rishwan (Ahmed Azim) a polite, obedient and reticent orphan who is considered an ignorant and mindless man by the rest of their staff. Soon after, a romantic relationship begins between them, while Sheeba's friend, Aathi sets her with a customer who has deeply fallen in love with Sheeba, Zubeyru (Hamid), a wealthy man. Rishwan, a heart patient, catches them together and becomes restless.

Soon after, Sheeba finds out that Zubeyru is a two-faced villain who has recently fled from Police and hence breaks up with him. Hence, Sheeba reconcile with Rishwan and continues their love affair. However things take a downfall when Zubeyru violently confronts him while on duty which causes a panic attack. The doctor advises to replace his heart with a donor’s. As soon as he regains consciousness, Rishwan comes back to Sheeba. Their happiness was short-lived as Rishwan dies due to heart failure and Sheeba promises to devote her whole life to him.

Cast 
 Ahmed Azim as Rishwan
 Mariyam Nisha as Sheeba
 Shazuna as Aathi
 Hamid as Zubeyru
 Saadhuna as Shiyama
 Arifa Ibrahim as Sheeba's mother
 Abdul Satthar as Doctor
 Hussain Shibau as a customer (Special appearance)
 Sakeena as Zubeyru's mother (Special appearance)

Soundtrack

Reception
Upon release, the film received mixed reviews from critics.

References

Maldivian drama films
1998 films
1998 drama films
Dhivehi-language films